The 2007 Sacramento State Hornets football team represented California State University, Sacramento as a member of the Big Sky Conference during the 2007 NCAA Division I FCS football season. Led by first-year head coach Marshall Sperbeck, Sacramento State compiled an overall record of 3–8 with a mark of 3–5 in conference play, tying for sixth place in the Big Sky. The team was outscored by its opponents 305 to 201 for the season. The Hornets played home games at Hornet Stadium in Sacramento, California.

Schedule

References

Sacramento State
Sacramento State Hornets football seasons
Sacramento State Hornets football